Eperjes is a village in Szentes District of Csongrád County, in the Southern Great Plain region of southern Hungary.

Geography
 

Populated places in Csongrád-Csanád County